Torre La Mata or simply La Mata is a district of Torrevieja located 5 km northeast of the city along the Costa Blanca, in the province of Alicante in southeast Spain. La Mata is often regarded as a dormitory suburb of Torrevieja.  Many of the residents are expatriates from the United Kingdom, Germany and other northern European countries.  Torre La Mata is renowned by tourists and locals for having an unspoilt Spanish charm, due to the lack of high-rise hotels and local affluence.

Places of interest
 Parque Natural de la Mata - A 'Natural Park' which boasts an abundance of wildlife.
 Paraje Natural Municipal Molino Del Agua - A natural park of the Water Mill
 Cabo Cervera
 Playa de la Mata - La Mata Beach
 Las Salinas-The salt-lakes where salt has been mined for centuries.

Municipalities in the Province of Alicante